Hannes Irmer (born c. 1988) is an American football offensive tackle for the Düsseldorf Panther of the German Football League.

Football career
Hannes Irmer began playing football with the TFG TYPHOONS, the only German High School Football program. He later joined the Duesseldorf Panther in 2006.
Since 2013 he lines up for the New Yorker Lions.

2011 IFAF World Cup
Hannes Irmer was named on the roster for the German national team for the 2011 IFAF World Cup in Austria.

References

External links
Düsseldorf Panther roster

Living people
German players of American football
Place of birth missing (living people)
1980s births
German Football League players